Johnny Williams (25 December 1926 – 28 January 2007) was a British former professional boxer in the 1940s and 1950s and was at one time both the British and Empire heavyweight champion.

Life and career
Born in Barmouth, Wales, Williams grew up in Rugby, England, his family having moved there when he was a toddler. He started to box from the age of 10. He turned professional in 1946 and was known for his scientific approach in the ring, with one of his greatest fights being a bout with Jack Gardner on 17 July 1950 in Leicester. It was a Commonwealth title eliminator fight and he lost on points, and according to the BBC it was rated as one of the most grueling bouts ever staged in Britain and left both boxers requiring a night in hospital.

Two years later on 11 March 1952, Williams had his finest hour, when in a rematch with Gardner, he won the 15 round fight, claiming both the British and Empire Heavyweight titles. However the following year he lost these titles to Don Cockell.

Williams made an attempt at winning back the titles in 1955, but was defeated in a fifth-round knockout by Gardner.

Williams retired in 1956 with 60 wins, 38 by knockout, 11 losses and 4 draws, and began a career as a farmer at Newton near Rugby.

He died on 28 January 2007 survived by his wife and daughter.

Professional boxing record

|-
|align="center" colspan=8|60 Wins (38 knockouts, 22 decisions), 11 Losses (6 knockouts, 5 decisions), 4 Draws 
|-
| align="center" style="border-style: none none solid solid; background: #e3e3e3"|Result
| align="center" style="border-style: none none solid solid; background: #e3e3e3"|Record
| align="center" style="border-style: none none solid solid; background: #e3e3e3"|Opponent
| align="center" style="border-style: none none solid solid; background: #e3e3e3"|Type
| align="center" style="border-style: none none solid solid; background: #e3e3e3"|Round
| align="center" style="border-style: none none solid solid; background: #e3e3e3"|Date
| align="center" style="border-style: none none solid solid; background: #e3e3e3"|Location
| align="center" style="border-style: none none solid solid; background: #e3e3e3"|Notes
|-align=center
|Loss
|
|align=left| Joe Bygraves
|TKO
|6
|1956-11-16
|align=left| Belle Vue Zoological Gardens, Belle Vue, Manchester
|align=left|
|-
|Loss
|
|align=left| Joe Erskine
|PTS
|15
|1956-08-27
|align=left| Maindy Stadium, Cardiff
|align=left|
|-
|Loss
|
|align=left| Tommy "Hurricane" Jackson
|TKO
|4
|1956-04-13
|align=left| Uline Arena, Washington, District of Columbia
|align=left|
|-
|Draw
|
|align=left| Willi Hoepner
|PTS
|10
|1956-02-04
|align=left| Festhalle Frankfurt, Frankfurt, Hesse
|align=left|
|-
|Win
|
|align=left| Kitione Lave
|TKO
|1
|1955-07-26
|align=left| Embassy Sportsdrome, Birmingham, West Midlands
|align=left|
|-
|Loss
|
|align=left| Jack Gardner
|KO
|5
|1955-06-06
|align=left| Nottingham Ice Stadium, Nottingham, Nottinghamshire
|align=left|
|-
|Win
|
|align=left| Lucien Touzard
|TKO
|3
|1955-04-18
|align=left| Maindy Stadium, Cardiff
|align=left|
|-
|Win
|
|align=left| Hennie Quentemeijer
|KO
|2
|1955-03-05
|align=left| Newtown, Powys
|align=left|
|-
|Win
|
|align=left| Roger Francis Coeuret
|TKO
|4
|1954-12-10
|align=left| Belle Vue Zoological Gardens, Belle Vue, Manchester
|align=left|
|-
|Win
|
|align=left| "Miracle" Jack Hobbs
|TKO
|7
|1954-09-14
|align=left| Harringay Arena, London
|align=left|
|-
|Win
|
|align=left| Hugo Salfeld
|PTS
|10
|1954-04-04
|align=left| Stadion Rote Erde, Dortmund, North Rhine-Westphalia
|align=left|
|-
|Win
|
|align=left| Gerhard Hecht
|KO
|2
|1954-01-22
|align=left| Sportpalast, Schoeneberg, Berlin
|align=left|
|-
|Win
|
|align=left| Bernard Verdoolaeghe
|PTS
|10
|1953-11-10
|align=left| Empress Hall, Earl's Court, London
|align=left|
|-
|Win
|
|align=left| Fred Powell
|KO
|2
|1953-10-05
|align=left| Granby Halls, Leicester, Leicestershire
|align=left|
|-
|Loss
|
|align=left| Don Cockell
|PTS
|15
|1953-05-12
|align=left| Harringay Arena, London
|align=left|
|-
|Win
|
|align=left| Ansell Adams
|PTS
|10
|1953-04-13
|align=left| Granby Halls, Leicester, Leicestershire
|align=left|
|-
|Loss
|
|align=left| Heinz Neuhaus
|KO
|9
|1953-02-15
|align=left| Westfalenhallen, Dortmund, North Rhine-Westphalia
|align=left|
|-
|Win
|
|align=left| Werner Wiegand
|KO
|5
|1952-12-10
|align=left| Harringay Arena, London
|align=left|
|-
|Win
|
|align=left| John Duncan Arthur
|TKO
|7
|1952-10-13
|align=left| Granby Halls, Leicester, Leicestershire
|align=left|
|-
|Win
|
|align=left| Jimmy Rouse
|TKO
|7
|1952-07-22
|align=left| Meadowbrook Bowl, Newark, New Jersey
|align=left|
|-
|Win
|
|align=left| Jack Gardner
|PTS
|15
|1952-03-11
|align=left| Empress Hall, Earl's Court, London
|align=left|
|-
|Win
|
|align=left| Omelio Agramonte
|PTS
|10
|1951-12-04
|align=left| Harringay Arena, London
|align=left|
|-
|Draw
|
|align=left| Heinz Neuhaus
|PTS
|10
|1951-10-14
|align=left| Stadion Rote Erde, Dortmund, North Rhine-Westphalia
|align=left|
|-
|Win
|
|align=left| Jo Weidin
|TKO
|6
|1951-06-05
|align=left| White City Stadium, London
|align=left|
|-
|Win
|
|align=left| Aaron Wilson
|PTS
|8
|1951-03-27
|align=left| Empress Hall, Earl's Court, London
|align=left|
|-
|Win
|
|align=left| Reg Andrews
|KO
|2
|1951-03-19
|align=left| Granby Halls, Leicester, Leicestershire
|align=left|
|-
|Loss
|
|align=left| Bill Weinberg
|TKO
|6
|1950-12-12
|align=left| Harringay Arena, London
|align=left|
|-
|Win
|
|align=left| George Kaplan
|TKO
|7
|1950-11-14
|align=left| Earls Court Arena, London
|align=left|
|-
|Loss
|
|align=left| Jack Gardner
|PTS
|12
|1950-07-17
|align=left| Granby Halls, Leicester, Leicestershire
|align=left|
|-
|Loss
|
|align=left| Pat Comiskey
|TKO
|6
|1950-06-06
|align=left| White City Stadium, London
|align=left|
|-
|Win
|
|align=left| Vern Escoe
|PTS
|10
|1950-02-28
|align=left| Harringay Arena, London
|align=left|
|-
|Win
|
|align=left| Lloyd Barnett
|PTS
|10
|1950-02-20
|align=left| Embassy Sportsdrome, Birmingham, West Midlands
|align=left|
|-
|Win
|
|align=left| Piet Wilde
|KO
|4
|1950-01-24
|align=left| Empress Hall, Earl's Court, London
|align=left|
|-
|Win
|
|align=left| Stephane Olek
|PTS
|8
|1949-09-06
|align=left| Harringay Arena, London
|align=left|
|-
|Win
|
|align=left| Piet Wilde
|PTS
|10
|1949-08-17
|align=left| Coney Beach Pleasure Park, Porthcawl
|align=left|
|-
|Win
|
|align=left| Paddy Slavin
|TKO
|3
|1949-06-20
|align=left| St Andrew's, Birmingham, West Midlands
|align=left|
|-
|Win
|
|align=left| Nils Andersson
|PTS
|8
|1949-06-02
|align=left| White City Stadium, London
|align=left|
|-
|Win
|
|align=left| Ken Shaw
|TKO
|8
|1949-04-19
|align=left| Royal Albert Hall, London
|align=left|
|-
|Win
|
|align=left| Nick Wolmarans
|TKO
|4
|1949-01-29
|align=left| Wembley Stadium, Johannesburg, Gauteng
|align=left|
|-
|Win
|
|align=left| Billy Wood
|KO
|4
|1948-12-16
|align=left| City Hall, Durban, Kwa-Zulu Natal
|align=left|
|-
|Win
|
|align=left| Fred Vorster
|PTS
|8
|1948-11-06
|align=left| Wembley Stadium, Johannesburg, Gauteng
|align=left|
|-
|Win
|
|align=left| Jock Frederick Taylor
|PTS
|6
|1948-09-21
|align=left| Harringay Arena, London
|align=left|
|-
|Win
|
|align=left| Reg Spring
|TKO
|6
|1948-09-02
|align=left| Exeter Civic Hall, Exeter, Devon
|align=left|
|-
|Win
|
|align=left| Don Cockell
|TKO
|2
|1948-07-27
|align=left| Embassy Rink, Birmingham, West Midlands
|align=left|
|-
|Win
|
|align=left| Gene "KO" Fowler
|KO
|3
|1948-06-22
|align=left| St James Park, Exeter, Devon
|align=left|
|-
|Loss
|
|align=left| Don Cockell
|PTS
|8
|1948-05-18
|align=left| Highfield Road, Coventry, West Midlands
|align=left|
|-
|Win
|
|align=left| Bobby Ogg
|PTS
|6
|1948-04-20
|align=left| Harringay Arena, London
|align=left|
|-
|Win
|
|align=left| Sid Falconer
|RTD
|3
|1948-03-11
|align=left| Smethwick, Sandwell, West Midlands
|align=left|
|-
|Win
|
|align=left| Billy Phillips
|TKO
|3
|1948-02-17
|align=left| Harringay Arena, London
|align=left|
|-
|Win
|
|align=left| Allan Cooke
|TKO
|1
|1948-02-12
|align=left| Hull Arena, Hull, Yorkshire
|align=left|
|-
|Win
|
|align=left| Matt Locke
|KO
|1
|1948-01-26
|align=left| Coventry Drill Hall, Coventry, West Midlands
|align=left|
|-
|Win
|
|align=left| Des Jones
|PTS
|8
|1948-01-15
|align=left| Rink Market, Smethwick, Sandwell, West Midlands
|align=left|
|-
|Loss
|
|align=left| Reg Spring
|PTS
|8
|1947-12-02
|align=left| Co-op Hall, Rugby, Warwickshire
|align=left|
|-
|Win
|
|align=left| Doug Richards
|PTS
|8
|1947-11-24
|align=left| Cheltenham Town Hall, Cheltenham, Gloucestershire
|align=left|
|-
|Win
|
|align=left| George Barratt
|TKO
|3
|1947-11-10
|align=left| Coventry, West Midlands
|align=left|
|-
|Win
|
|align=left| Jimmy Carroll
|KO
|5
|1947-11-03
|align=left| Granby Halls, Leicester, Leicestershire
|align=left|
|-
|Win
|
|align=left| Trevor Burt
|KO
|2
|1947-09-16
|align=left| Battery Drill Hall, Rugby, Warwickshire
|align=left|
|-
|Win
|
|align=left| Jimmy Carroll
|TKO
|5
|1947-08-12
|align=left| Wembley Town Hall, London
|align=left|
|-
|Win
|
|align=left| Bernard O'Neill
|TKO
|2
|1947-07-07
|align=left| Wembley Town Hall, London
|align=left|
|-
|Draw
|
|align=left| Johnny Houlston
|PTS
|8
|1947-06-16
|align=left| Corporation Bus Depot, Newport
|align=left|
|-
|Win
|
|align=left| Paddy Roche
|TKO
|7
|1947-04-03
|align=left| Leamington, Warwickshire
|align=left|
|-
|Win
|
|align=left| Jock Kerry
|TKO
|5
|1947-03-24
|align=left| Birmingham, West Midlands
|align=left|
|-
|Win
|
|align=left| Wally With
|PTS
|8
|1947-03-19
|align=left| Caledonian Road Baths, London
|align=left|
|-
|Win
|
|align=left| Art Owen
|TKO
|6
|1947-02-24
|align=left| Kettering, Northamptonshire
|align=left|
|-
|Win
|
|align=left| Ted Barter
|KO
|3
|1947-02-10
|align=left| Oxford Town Hall, Oxford, Oxfordshire
|align=left|
|-
|Win
|
|align=left| Tommy Bostock
|TKO
|4
|1946-12-09
|align=left| Assembly Rooms, Market Harborough, Leicestershire
|align=left|
|-
|Win
|
|align=left| Joe Burt
|PTS
|8
|1946-11-04
|align=left| Birmingham, West Midlands
|align=left|
|-
|Draw
|
|align=left| Jim Greaves
|PTS
|8
|1946-10-21
|align=left| Granby Halls, Leicester, Leicestershire
|align=left|
|-
|Win
|
|align=left| Jim Hollis
|PTS
|6
|1946-09-24
|align=left| Embassy Rink, Birmingham, West Midlands
|align=left|
|-
|Win
|
|align=left| Harry O'Grady
|KO
|4
|1946-06-04
|align=left| Battery Drill Hall, Rugby, Warwickshire
|align=left|
|-
|Win
|
|align=left| Joe Williams
|PTS
|8
|1946-04-15
|align=left| Birmingham, West Midlands
|align=left|
|-
|Win
|
|align=left| "Seaman" Tom Smith
|TKO
|5
|1946-04-01
|align=left| Birmingham, West Midlands
|align=left|
|-
|Win
|
|align=left|Michael Guerin
|KO
|1
|1946-02-26
|align=left| Co-op Hall, Rugby, Warwickshire
|align=left|
|-
|Win
|
|align=left| "Seaman" Tom Smith
|PTS
|6
|1946-02-15
|align=left| Crossington Street Baths, Leicester, Leicestershire
|align=left|
|-
|Win
|
|align=left| Billy Rhodes
|PTS
|6
|1946-02-12
|align=left| Crossington Street Baths, Leicester, Leicestershire
|align=left|
|}

See also
List of British heavyweight boxing champions
List of Commonwealth Boxing Council champions

References

External links
 
 Welcome To New Champion 1952 – Short British Pathé newsreel of Williams at a victory celebration in 1952

1926 births
2007 deaths
Sportspeople from Gwynedd
Welsh male boxers
Heavyweight boxers
Sportspeople from Rugby, Warwickshire